Cycas saxatilis is a species of cycad found only on Saint Paul's Mountain, Palawan, Philippines.

References

saxatilis
Endemic flora of the Philippines
Flora of Palawan